Cowiedesmus is an extinct millipede genus known from the middle Silurian of Scotland, and is one of the earliest known land animals. Cowiedesmus was about 4 cm (1.6 in) long and characterized by a greatly enlarged pair of legs on the 8th segment which may have been used in clasping females or functioned as gonopods (modified legs used to insert sperm during mating). Coweiedesmus is distinct enough from other living and fossil millipedes to be placed in its own order, Cowiedesmida. The only known species, C. eroticopodus, was described in 2004.

The name Cowiedesmus references the Cowie Formation, a geological formation at Cowie Harbor, near the village of Stonehaven, Scotland, where the fossil was found and desmus, a common root word in millipede nomenclature meaning "bond" or "bridge". The specific epithet eroticopodus means "erotic foot".

References

Silurian myriapods
†Cowiedesmus
Prehistoric myriapod genera
Extinct animals of Europe
Fossil taxa described in 2004
Fossils of Scotland
Silurian Scotland
2004 in Scotland
Stonehaven
History of Aberdeenshire